Yes, Dear is an American television sitcom created by Alan Kirschenbaum and Gregory Garcia, that aired on CBS from October 2, 2000, to February 15, 2006, with the total of six seasons and 122 episodes. It starred Anthony Clark, Jean Louisa Kelly, Mike O'Malley, and Liza Snyder.

Critically panned and expected to be one of the first new series to be canceled during its first season, Yes, Dear ended up being a sleeper hit for CBS. In March 2006, CBS cancelled the series after 6 seasons, after star Anthony Clark was hired to host NBC's Last Comic Standing.

Premise
Greg Warner, a successful businessman in the film industry, and Kim, his level-headed stay-at-home wife, do their best to be the perfect parents to their young son, Sammy (and later daughter, Emily). Things become difficult when Kim's sister Christine and her husband Jimmy Hughes move into the Warners' guest house with their two rambunctious boys, Dominic and Logan.

Episodes

Cast

Main Cast
Anthony Clark as Gregory "Greg" Warner
Jean Louisa Kelly as Kimberly "Kim" Warner (née Ludke)
Mike O'Malley as James "Jimmy" Hughes Jr.
Liza Snyder as Christine Hughes (née Ludke)

Recurring

Children
Joel Homan as Dominic Hughes (Episodes 3–122) (credited as Main Cast)
Anthony and Michael Bain as Sammy Warner
Madison and Marissa Poer as Emily Warner (Seasons 4-6)
Christopher and Nicholas Berry as Logan Hughes (Seasons 1-2)
Alexander and Shawn Shapiro as Logan Hughes (Season 3 Ep 2-9)
Brendon Baerg as Logan Hughes (Seasons 3-6)
 A running gag in the later seasons involves Jimmy being confused when reflecting on Logan's childhood, by showing short scenes of each of Logan's various actors (i.e. Logan constantly being a different child and hence his appearance always changing)

Grandparents
Tim Conway as Tom Warner (Greg's father)
Vicki Lawrence as Natalie Warner (Greg's mother)
Jerry Van Dyke as James "Big Jimmy" Hughes Sr. (Jimmy's father)
Beth Grant as Kitty Hughes (Jimmy's mother)
Dan Hedaya as Don Ludke (Kim and Christine's father)
Alley Mills as Jenny Ludke (Kim and Christine's mother)

Co-Workers
Billy Gardell as Billy Colivita
Phill Lewis as Roy Barr
Brian Doyle-Murray as Mr. George Savitsky

Cancellation 
CBS had announced the cancellation of Yes, Dear in early 2004, but later ordered 13 mid-season episodes, after the show cut its license fee to secure the renewal. After canceling Center of the Universe, CBS debuted the fifth season of Yes, Dear on Wednesday, February 16, 2005, at 9:30 p.m. Eastern. CBS ordered a fifth season over 22 episodes from 2005 to 2006, but that order was then reduced to 13 episodes - however two episodes were prevented from airing due to breaking news events and were pushed to season six.

Transmission 
For the fall of 2004, TBS picked up the syndication rights of the show, airing it at 1:00 p.m, before switching to a 3:00 p.m. airtime in January. In the fall of 2006, 20th Television, the 20th Century Fox distribution subsidiary, took back show in the form of bartering syndication from TBS and replaced it with Still Standing. In 2012, it began airing at 10:00 pm. Monday through Friday on Nick at Nite. On August 1, 2012, CMT began showing re-runs of the series during the week from 5:00 p.m. to 7:00 p.m. The program was also aired on Nick Jr. from February 3, 2013 to May 2, 2015, as part of the short lived NickMom block. The series airs on TV Land and Logo TV until it’s move to VH1 and CMT on January 1, 2021.

Connection with Raising Hope 
In 2010, Garcia premiered a new show, titled Raising Hope from Fox. In the third season, in episode sixteen, Brian Doyle-Murray is shown as an executive of the Hollywood studio, a reference to his role as Mr. Savitsky.

The next episode, Mike O'Malley and Liza Snyder reprise the characters of Jimmy and Christine Hughes and are prominently featured as characters who have made a habit of watching a sex video made by the characters in the new series, Virginia and Burt Chance. Dominic, Logan, and the guest house are also referred to in the conversation.  Jimmy makes another appearance in the fourth season, in episode 19 (a different actress portrays Christine and is renamed Christy).

References

External links

2000s American sitcoms
2000 American television series debuts
2006 American television series endings
CBS original programming
English-language television shows
Television series about families
Television series about sisters
Television series by CBS Studios
Television series by 20th Century Fox Television
Television shows set in Los Angeles